Andrea Cambiaso (born 20 February 2000) is an Italian professional footballer who plays as a full-back for  club Bologna, on loan from Juventus.

Club career

Genoa
He is a product of Genoa youth teams. He spent 2017–18 and 2018–19 seasons on loan to Serie D clubs Albissola and Savona respectively. He helped Albissola achieve promotion to Serie C.

He returned to Genoa for the 2021–22 season, and he scored his first goal in Serie A on 29 August 2021 in a 2–1 home defeat against Napoli.

Loan to Alessandria
On 2 August 2019 he joined Serie C club Alessandria on loan.

He made his professional Serie C debut for Alessandria on 25 August 2019 in a season-opening game against Gozzano. He started the game and played the whole match. He established himself as a starter with Alessandria early in the season. He suffered an ACL tear on 4 December 2019 in a game against Juventus U23 (which was his 17th start for the club), the injury would keep him unable to play for the rest of the 2019–20 season.

Loan to Empoli
On 21 September 2020, he joined Serie B club Empoli on loan with an option to purchase.

Juventus 
On 14 July 2022, Juventus announced the signing of Cambiaso on a five-year contract.

Loan to Bologna
On 15 July 2022, Cambiaso joined Bologna on a season-long loan.

Career statistics

References

2000 births
Footballers from Genoa
Living people
Italian footballers
Association football midfielders
Albissola 2010 players
Savona F.B.C. players
U.S. Alessandria Calcio 1912 players
Empoli F.C. players
Genoa C.F.C. players
Juventus F.C. players
Bologna F.C. 1909 players
Serie A players
Serie B players
Serie C players
Serie D players